The 2017 Tour du Haut Var was a road cycling stage race that took place on 18 and 19 February 2017. The race was rated as a 2.1 event as part of the 2017 UCI Europe Tour, and was the 49th edition of the Tour du Haut Var.

Just as it was in 2016, the overall race victory was decided upon cumulative stage finishes, after nine riders finished both stages in the same time. With stage finishes of second and third, Arthur Vichot took honours in both the general classification and the points classification for the  team. Second place in the overall standings went to Julien Simon with finishes of eighth and first, while the podium was completed by 's Romain Hardy, with two sixth-place finishes.

Teams
Sixteen teams were invited to start the race. These included three UCI WorldTeams, six UCI Professional Continental teams and seven UCI Continental teams.

Route

Stages

Stage 1
18 February 2017 — Le Cannet-des-Maures to Saint-Paul-en-Forêt,

Stage 2
19 February 2017 — Draguignan to Draguignan,

Classification leadership table
In the 2017 Tour du Haut Var, four different jerseys were awarded. For the general classification, calculated by adding each cyclist's finishing times on each stage, the leader received a yellow jersey. This classification was considered the most important of the 2017 Tour du Haut Var, and the winner of the classification was considered the winner of the race.

Additionally, there was a points classification, which awarded a green jersey. In the points classification, cyclists received points for finishing in the top 15 in a mass-start stage. For winning a stage, a rider earned 25 points, with 20 for second, 16 for third, 14 for fourth, 12 for fifth, 10 for sixth, then 1 point fewer per place down to 1 for 15th place. Points towards the classification could also be accrued at intermediate sprint points during each stage. There was also a mountains classification, the leadership of which was marked by a red jersey. In the mountains classification, points were won by reaching the top of a climb before other cyclists, with more points available for the higher-categorised climbs.

The fourth jersey represented the young rider classification, marked by a white jersey. This was decided in the same way as the general classification, but only riders born after 1 January 1993 were eligible to be ranked in the classification. There was also a classification for teams, in which the times of the best three cyclists per team on each stage were added together; the leading team at the end of the race was the team with the lowest total time.

References

External links

2017 UCI Europe Tour
2017 in French sport
2017